Kahak (also Romanized as Kakhak, Kūhak, and Kūkak) is a village in Khorramabad Rural District, Esfarvarin District, Takestan County, Qazvin Province, Iran. At the 2006 census, its population was 1,956, in 440 families.

References 

Populated places in Takestan County